RVI may mean:

 Radio Vlaanderen Internationaal, a Belgian radio broadcasting service
 Rapid Visual Imaging, a technique used in moving media
 Residual Value Insurance
 Renault Véhicules Industriels, a French truck and bus manufacturer (today Renault Trucks)
 The Royal Victoria Infirmary in Newcastle upon Tyne, England
 Rexx Variable Interface
 Roberston Ventilation Industries
 Rapid Virtualization Indexing, an AMD technology
 Remote visual inspection
 Recently viewed items
 Rostov-on-Don Airport (IATA airport code)
 Routed VLAN Interface